Seixal is a former civil parish in the municipality (concelho) of Seixal, Lisbon metropolitan area, Portugal. In 2013, the parish merged into the new parish Seixal, Arrentela e Aldeia de Paio Pires. The population in 2011 was 2,776, in an area of 3.73 km². Its inhabitants are known as "Seixalenses".

Sites of interests
Moinho Novo dos Paulistas
Moinho Velho dos Paulistas
Seixal Bay, a natural wetland

References

Former parishes of Seixal